Hard Attack may refer to:

 Hard Attack (Sirius XM), a radio channel now called Liquid Metal
 Hard Attack (Dust album), 1972
 Hard Attack (MX-80 album),1977